The 1887 Dublin University by-election was a parliamentary by-election held for the United Kingdom House of Commons constituency of Dublin University on 7–12 July 1887.

The by-election resulted from the resignation of Hugh Holmes, one of the members in this two-seat constituency, following his appointment as a high court judge. Two candidates were nominated: Richard Clere Parsons, an engineer and third son of the Earl of Rosse, and Dodgson Hamilton Madden, a serjeant-at-law. Parsons received 712 votes; Madden received 1,376 and was therefore elected.

John Thomas Ball, a former Lord Chancellor of Ireland, was on Madden's support committee and seconded his nomination on 7 July. At the time, Ball was one of the Lords Justices of Ireland deputising for Charles Vane-Tempest-Stewart, 6th Marquess of Londonderry, the absent Lord Lieutenant of Ireland. Members of the irish Parliamentary Party complained in the Commons that Ball's action was inappropriate.

Result

References

1887 elections in the United Kingdom
By-elections to the Parliament of the United Kingdom in Dublin University
1887 elections in Ireland